João Tordo (born 1975, Lisboa) is a Portuguese writer and a son of Fernando Tordo.

Biography 
João Tordo was born in Lisbon, on 28 August 1975 to the famous singer Fernando Tordo. He graduated in philosophy and studied journalism and creative writing in London and New York. His novel As Três Vidas won the José Saramago Prize in 2009. He published nine novels: The Book of Lightless Men (2004), Memory Hotel (2007), Three Lives (2009), The Good Winter (2010), The Anatomy of Martyrs (2011), The Sabbatical Year (2013) Accidental Biography Of a Love Affair (2014) Mourning Elias Gro (2015) and Eden According to Lars D. (2015).

He was shortlisted for the Portugal Telecom Prize, for the Portuguese Society for Authors Award for Narrative Fiction, the Fernando Namora Literary Prize and for the 6th edition of the European Literature Prize.

His books are published in many countries, such as France, Italy and Brazil.

As a screenplay writer, he participated in many television series, including O Segredo de Miguel Zuzarte (RTP), 4 (RTP) and Liberdade XXI (RTP). He still works as a chronicler and a trainer in Fiction Workshops dedicated to Creative Writind and to Novels.

Works

Novels

 The Book of Lightless Men (Temas e Debates), Novembro de 2004
 Memory Hotel (Quidnovi), Fevereiro de 2007
 Three Lives (Quidnovi), Setembro de 2008, José Saramago Prize 2009
 The Good Winter (Dom Quixote), Setembro 2010
 The Anatomy of Martyrs (Dom Quixote), Novembro 2011
 The Sabbatical Year (Dom Quixote), Fevereiro 2013
 Accidental Biography of a Love Affair, Alfaguara, Abril 2014

Anthologies

 "Contos de Vampiros", Porto Editora, 2009
 "Dez História Para Ser Feliz", Dom Quixote, 2009
 "Um Natal Assim", Quidnovi, 2008
 "Contos de Terror do Homem Peixe", Chimpanzé Intelectual, 2007
 "O Homem Que Desenhava na Cabeça dos Outros", Oficina do Livro, 2006

References

External links 
 
 Wook Biography
 João Tordo (interview – in Portuguese)

1975 births
Living people
Portuguese male writers